George Brooke may refer to:

George Brook (cricketer) (1888–1966), English cricketer
, British zoologist
George H. Brooke (1874–1938), American football player and coach
George C. Brooke (1884–1934), British numismatist
George Brooke (conspirator) (1568–1603), British aristocrat executed for conspiracy against James VI of Scotland and I of England
George Brooke, 9th Baron Cobham (–1558), English nobleman
George Brooke (MP), MP for Eye
George J. Brooke, British biblical scholar
George Mercer Brooke (1785–1851), Colonel who established Fort Brooke, predecessor to Tampa, Florida
George Brooke alias Cobham, MP for Portsmouth

See also
George's Brook, Newfoundland village
George Brooks (disambiguation)